The climate of Armenia varies depending on the altitude of the respective region. Climates vary from cold desert on the lower parts of the Ararat plain, to tundra on mountain peaks. The following six basic types can be distinguished. Another type of climate is the dry continental type. It prevails mostly along the middle reaches of the Arax up to an elevation of 1,300 m. It differs from the dry subtropical climate by its cold winters.

History
According to historical sources, in ancient times the winter was the same as it is today, fairly cold in the Armenian lowlands and high in the mountains. 4th century B.C. Greek historian Xenophon, in his Anabasis (The Retreat of the 10,000), which describes the retreat of 10,000 Greek mercenaries through the Armenian mountains into the autumn, related that at night, when the soldiers were asleep, snow fell in the mountains and covered the men and their weapons. He wrote that the snow that fell in one night was about one meter deep. In the same work he noted that the Armenians protected themselves against the freezing frost by rubbing fat or almond oil into their bodies. Armenian historian Movses Khorenatsi (5th century A. D.) described the climate of the Ararat plain as hot and dry in the summer.

See also
 Geography of Armenia

References

External links
Blizzard sweeps up Armenia, temperatures go subzero

Environment of Armenia
Armenia